Vice Admiral Dinesh K Tripathi, AVSM, NM is a serving Flag officer in the Indian Navy. He currently serves as the Flag Officer Commanding-in-Chief Western Naval Command. He earlier served as the Chief of Personnel (COP) and as the Director General of Naval Operations (DGNO) at Naval HQ. His earlier appointments include Commandant of Indian Naval Academy and Flag Officer Commanding Eastern Fleet (FOCEF).

Early life and education
Tripathi graduated from the Sainik School Rewa, and National Defence Academy, Pune.

Naval career 
Tripathi was commissioned into the Indian Navy in the Executive branch on 1 July 1985. He is a specialist in Communication and Electronic warfare. In the early years of his career, he served as a Signals Communication officer and Electronic Warfare Officer of the Guided missile destroyer, .
He has completed the staff course at the Defence Services Staff College (DSSC) in Wellington Cantonment where he won the Thimayya Medal, the higher command course at the Naval War College, Goa. He has also attended the Naval War College, Newport, Rhode Island in the United States when he was awarded the Robert E Bateman International Prize.

Tripathi has commanded the Veer-class missile vessel , the Kora-class corvette  and the Talwar-class Guided missile frigate . He has also served as the Second-in-command of the Delhi-class Guided missile destroyer .

Tripathi has served as the Fleet Operations Officer of the Western Fleet. In his staff appointments, he has served as the Director of Naval Operations and as the Principal Director Network Centric Operations. He also served as the Principal Director Naval Plans at Naval HQ.

Flag rank
On promotion to Flag Rank, Tripathi took over as the Assistant Chief of Naval Staff (Policy and Plans) at Naval HQ. He then assumed the office of Flag Officer Commanding Eastern Fleet on 15 January 2018. For his command of the Eastern Fleet, he was awarded the Ati Vishisht Seva Medal on 26 January 2019.

On 12 June 2019,  on promotion to the rank of Vice Admiral, Tripathy took over as the Commandant of Indian Naval Academy from Vice Admiral R. B. Pandit. Under him, the INA was presented with the President's Colour, on 20 November 2019. On 13 August 2020, he assumed charge as the Director general Naval Operations (DGNO) at Naval HQ.

He assumed the charge of Chief of Personnel on 1 June 2021 succeeding Vice Admiral Ravneet Singh. After about 2 years as COP, he was appointed Flag Officer Commanding-in-Chief Western Naval Command. He took over from Vice Admiral Ajendra Bahadur Singh on 1 March 2023.

Personal life
Tripathi is married to Shashi Tripathi, an artist and homemaker. The couple have a son, a lawyer.

Awards and decorations

See also
 Flag Officer Commanding Eastern Fleet
 Eastern Fleet
 Commandant of Indian Naval Academy

References 

Living people
Year of birth missing (living people)
Indian Navy admirals
National Defence Academy (India) alumni
Defence Services Staff College alumni
Naval War College, Goa alumni
Naval War College alumni
Recipients of the Ati Vishisht Seva Medal
Recipients of the Nau Sena Medal
Flag Officers Commanding Eastern Fleet
Commandants of the Indian Naval Academy
Chiefs of Personnel (India)